The Beginning and the End is the fourth solo album by Bizzy Bone. It was released on November 7, 2004, on the Internet only, and featured many 7th Sign artists of the time.

Track listing
 "Time Travel (feat. Prince Rasu, Thug Queen)"
 "Stress Builds (feat. Big B, Prince Rasu)"
 "Try Hustle Me (feat. Hollis Jae)"
 "Weed Song (feat. Big B, Capo, Prince Rasu, Weezy)"
 "Split Personalities (feat. Capo)"
 "Be Careful Pt. 2 (feat. Big B, Prince Rasu)"
 "Ride or Die (feat. Big B, Capo, Prince Rasu, Weezy)"
 "Head To The Ground (feat. Layzie Bone)"
 "Satan's Desciples"
 "Feelin' Lovely"
 "Hellafied Game"
 "Hit the Reefah (feat. Big B)"
 "Good vs Evil (feat. Prince Rasu)"
 "Skit"
 "? Do We Die and Prayer"

References

Bizzy Bone albums
2004 albums